is a mallet team sport inspired by croquet.  It is a fast-paced, non-contact, highly strategic team game, which can be played by anyone regardless of age or gender. Gateball is most popular in China, Indonesia, Japan, South Korea and Taiwan, with a growing presence in other countries.

Each court has three gates and a goal pole. The game is played by two teams (red and white) of up to five players. Each player has a numbered ball corresponding to their playing order. The odd-numbered balls are red and the even-numbered balls are white. Teams score one point for each ball hit through a gate and two points for hitting the goal pole, in accordance with the rules. A game of gateball lasts for thirty minutes and the winner is the team with the most points at the end of the game.

History
Gateball was invented in Japan by Suzuki Kazunobu in 1947.  At the time there was a severe shortage of rubber needed to make the balls used in many sports.   Suzuki, then working in the lumber industry on the northern island of Hokkaido, realised there was a ready supply of the wood used to make croquet balls and mallets.  He revised the rules of croquet and created gateball as a game for young people.

Gateball first became popular in the late 1950s when a physical education instructor introduced gateball to the women's societies and senior citizens' clubs of Kumamoto City.  In 1962, the Kumamoto Gateball Association was formed and established a local set of rules. This version of the game became known nationally when it was demonstrated at a national fitness meet in Kumamoto in 1976.  Shortly afterwards gateball's popularity exploded as local government officials and representatives of senior citizens' organisations introduced the sport around the country.

In 1984, the Japanese Gateball Union (JGU) was founded.  Under the leadership of its inaugural chairman, Ryoichi Sasakawa, the JGU developed a unified set of rules and organised the first national meet.  The following year, the JGU joined with five countries and regions, China, Korea, Brazil, United States of America and Chinese Taipei (Taiwan), to form the World Gateball Union (WGU).  The WGU has since been joined by Bolivia (1987), Paraguay (1987), Peru (1987), Argentina (1989), Canada (1989), Singapore (1994), Hong Kong (1998), Australia (2003), Macao (2005), Philippines (2012) and Indonesia (2013).

Gameplay

Gateball is played between two teams of up to five people on a rectangular field 15–20 meters long and 20-25 wide.  The two teams use five balls each, either red or white depending on the team, and play in an alternating fashion between red and white the balls numbered from 1 to 10.  Each player plays the same ball throughout the game.  At the beginning of the game the players, in order, place their ball in the designated "start area" and attempt to hit the ball through the first gate.  If they successfully pass through the gate they may play again.  If the player misses the first gate, or their ball passes through the first gate but ends up outside of the court, they pick up their ball and have to try again in the second round.  Since the 2015 rule changes, a ball going through the first gate but ending up out of bounds is deemed to have passed the first gate but is an outball and will attempt to enter court on their next turn from the place the ball went outball.

When stroking, if the ball hits another ball, this is called a "touch".  If both the stroker's ball and the touched ball remain within the inside line, the stroker shall step on the stroker's ball and place the other touched ball so that it is touching the stroker's ball, and hit the stroker's ball with the stick (this play is called a "spark"), sending the other touched ball off as the result of the impact.  By passing through a gate or sparking the ball, a player receives another turn.

One point is given for every gate the ball passes in order and two points for hitting the goal-pole.  The winner is the team with the most points at the end of thirty minutes.  As the red team always gets to play first, the white team always has the final turn, even if time has elapsed before the final white ball is called.

Competitions

World Games
In 2001, gateball was included as an exhibition event at the 6th World Games.  The competition was held in Akita Prefecture in Japan and was attended by teams from China, Japan, South Korea, the USA and Chinese Taipei.  The final was won by a team of mostly teenage players from Japan.

World Gateball Championship
The World Gateball Championships are held every four years.  The inaugural championship in 1986 was played in Hokkaido with teams from Brazil, China, Chinese Taipei, Japan, Korea and the United States of America.  Subsequent championships were held in Hawaii (1998); Toyama, Japan (2002); Jeju, South Korea (2006); Shanghai, China( 2010); and Niigata (Japan) in 2014.

The 10th World Championship was played on 17–19 September 2010 in Shanghai China.  The competition was contested by 96 teams from 14 countries/regions including Australia, Brazil, China, Chinese Taipei, Hong Kong, India, Japan, Paraguay, the Philippines, South Korea, Russia and the USA.

The 12th World Championship was held in São Paulo In Brazil on September 21–23 in 2018.

References

External links

 World Gateball Union
 Rules of Gateball

Croquet
Sport in Japan
Sports originating in Japan